The Buick Standard Six Series 20  was manufactured by Buick at the Flint Wagon Works factory of Flint, Michigan, and was the junior model to the Buick Master Six between 1925 through 1929, and shared the GM A platform with Oldsmobile, Oakland and Chevrolet. The Standard Six evolved from the earlier Buick Six when the Buick 4-cylinder was cancelled. The Standard Six was the most popular Buick sold while being more upscale to the Oldsmobile Six. It was the senior brand to Marquette under the General Motors Companion Make Program until Marquette was cancelled one year later. It replaced the earlier Buick Six that was introduced in 1916, and was replaced with the Buick Series 50. Coachwork continued to be offered by Fisher Body who was the primary supplier of all GM products at this time, and Duco automotive lacquer paint, introduced by DuPont was the first quick drying multi-color line of nitrocellulose lacquers made especially for the automotive industry.

Buick Standard Six specifications (1926 data)

 Color – Brewster green
 Seating Capacity – Five
 Wheelbase – 114.5 inches
 Wheels - Wood
 Tires - 31” × 4.95” balloon
 Service Brakes - contracting on four wheels
 Emergency Brakes - expanding on rear wheels
 Engine  - Six cylinder, vertical, cast en block, 3 × 4½ inches; head removable; valves in head; H.P. 21.6 N.A.C.C. rating
 Lubrication – Force feed
 Crankshaft - Four bearing
 Radiator – Cellular
 Cooling – Water pump
 Ignition – High tension generator and storage battery
 Starting System – Single Unit
 Voltage – Six to eight
 Wiring System – Single
 Gasoline System – Vacuum
 Clutch – Dry plate, multiple disc
 Transmission – Selective sliding
 Gear Changes – 3 forward, 1 reverse
 Drive – Spiral bevel
 Rear Springs – Cantilever
 Rear Axle – Three-quarters floating
 Steering Gear – Worm and nut

Standard equipment
New car price included the following items:
 tools
 jack
 speedometer
 ammeter
 electric horn
 transmission theft lock
 automatic windshield cleaner
 spare tire carrier with extra demountable rim
 rear view mirror
 gasoline tank gauge
 parking lights on cowl
 headlight dimmers
 tail lamp
 instrument board lamp
 pressure grease gun
 windshield type ventilator
 dome light
 foot rest
 rear window curtain and sunshade

Prices
New car prices were F.O.B. factory, plus Tax:
 Five Passenger Coach - $1295 ($ in  dollars )
 Five Passenger Double Service Sedan - $1475 ($ in  dollars )
 Two Passenger Roadster - $1150 ($ in  dollars )
 Two Passenger Enclosed Roadster - $1190 ($ in  dollars )
 Five Passenger Touring - $1175 ($ in  dollars )
 Five Passenger Enclosed Touring - $1250 ($ in  dollars )
 Two Passenger Double Service Coupé - $1375 ($ in  dollars )
 Five Passenger Sedan - $1665 ($ in  dollars )
 Four Passenger Coupé - $1565 ($ in  dollars )

See also
Cadillac Type V-63
Oldsmobile Model 30
Oakland Six
Chevrolet Superior

References

 Source: 

Standard Six